Ordes is a municipality of northwestern Spain in the province of A Coruña, in the autonomous community of Galicia. It belongs to the comarca of Ordes. The population in 2008 was 12,534 inhabitants, according to the INE.

Etymology 
According to E. Bascuas, "Ordes", registered as Ordines in the 11th century, would derive from a form *ord- belonging to the old European hydronymy, and derived from the Indoeuropean  root *er- 'flow, move'.

References

External links
Concello de Ordes

Municipalities in the Province of A Coruña